National Audit Office of Lithuania (literally, State Control) is the supreme audit institution in Lithuania, functioning as the independent auditor for the Parliament of Lithuania.

The National Audit Office is enshrined in the Chapter XII of the Constitution of Lithuania.

History 
The institution was established on 16 January 1919, as Lithuanian State Control Institution, when the first laws regulating the audit activities were adopted. The modern institution was restored on 5 April 1990.

National Audit Office of Lithuania is a member of the International Organization of Supreme Audit Institutions since 1992 and a member of the European Organization of Supreme Audit Institutions since 1993.

Role 
The primary objectives of the institution are:
 to examine whether the state finances, assets and other resources are used and managed lawfully and efficiently;
 provide recommendations and encourage more efficient and effective management and use of resources in the public sector.
The institution is regulated by the Law on National Audit Office 1995.

The Budget Policy Monitoring Department (BPMD) was established in 2015 to monitor Lithuania's compliance with the rules and targets in the European Economic and Monetary Union.

See also 
 European Court of Auditors
 Other "Supreme audit institutions"

References

External links
Official site

Government agencies of Lithuania
Auditing organizations
Government audit
Supreme audit institutions
1919 establishments in Lithuania